Oliver Perry Hubbard (November 7, 1857 ― October 4, 1948) was a Progressive member of the Alaska Senate from 1915 to 1919. He represented the 3rd district and served as President of the Alaska Senate during the 3rd Territorial Legislature.

Hubbard attended college at Butler University and earned his law degree from Georgetown University. Professionally, he worked as a clerk for the Indiana General Assembly and an official reporter for the Superior Court in Henry County, Indiana. He then took work with the United States Department of Justice as private secretary to William H. H. Miller and an assistant attorney in the Indian Depredation Claims Division, before taking up private practice in Chicago.

He became a railroad promoter in the late 1890s eventually practicing law in Nome, Alaska, for a time. Hubbard was an advocate for statehood and proposed a bill calling on Congress to grant such status to the Territory of Alaska. While President of the Senate, he opted to place a referendum on the ballot to establish an eight-hour work day in Alaska. He served on the Alaska Territorial Board of Education. By 1920, Hubbard had become a Republican.

Hubbard died on October 4, 1948 at his home in West Hartford, Connecticut.

References

1857 births
1948 deaths
Progressive Party (United States, 1912) politicians
Georgetown University alumni
Butler University alumni
Members of the Alaska Territorial Legislature
Presidents of the Alaska Senate
People from Wabash, Indiana
20th-century American politicians
Lawyers from Chicago
Alaska lawyers